The Ranch steak comes from the chuck cut of a cow, namely the shoulder.  Technically it is called a "boneless chuck shoulder center cut steak", but supermarkets usually use the shorter and more memorable term: "Ranch steak". A ranch steak is usually cut no thicker than one inch, weighs 10 ounces or less, and is usually trimmed of all excess fat.

Ranch steak is generally flavorful, but a bit tough. The best results are achieved if the steak is not cooked beyond medium when using dry heat cooking methods. It is best when it is braised; however, it is excellent when grilled, broiled, or pan-fried if it is marinated first and if it is not overcooked.

References

Cuts of beef